Acacia anthochaera is a shrub or tree belonging to the genus Acacia and the subgenus Phyllodineae native to Western Australia.

It blooms from August to December and produces yellow flowers.

The species was first formally described by the botanist Bruce Maslin in 1995 as part of the work Acacia Miscellany Taxonomy of some Western Australian "Uninerves-Racemosae" species (Leguminosae: Mimosoideae: section Phyllodineae) as published in the journal Nuytsia. The species as reclassified as Racosperma anthochaerum in 2003 by Leslie Pedley but returned to the genus Acacia in 2006.

It is endemic to an area in the Mid West and  Wheatbelt regions of Western Australia.

See also
List of Acacia species

References

anthochaera
Acacias of Western Australia
Plants described in 1995
Taxa named by Bruce Maslin